Millis is a surname. Notable people with the surname include:

Harry A. Millis (1873–1948), American economist
Keith Millis (1915–1992), American metallurgical engineer
Nancy Millis (1922–2012), Australian microbiologist
Robert L. Millis , astronomer
Walter Millis (1899–1968), American writer